U.S.D.A. (United Street Dopeboyz of America) is an American hip hop group from Atlanta. The group's founder, Atlanta-based rapper Jeezy (formerly known as Young Jeezy), officially brought the group mainstream after his departure from Boyz n da Hood. The original group consisted of Young Jeezy, Slick Pulla and Blood Raw. Blood Raw has since left the group.

Albums

Singles

External links 
U.S.D.A's Official Def Jam Site
YoungJeezy.com
 Corporate Thugz Entertainment

American hip hop groups
Def Jam Recordings artists
Gangsta rap groups
Musical groups from Georgia (U.S. state)
Southern hip hop groups
Musical groups established in 2005
2005 establishments in Georgia (U.S. state)
Jeezy